Barakaldo Club de Fútbol is a Spanish football team based in Barakaldo, in the autonomous community of the Basque Country. Founded in 1917 it plays in Tercera División RFEF – Group 4, holding home matches at Lasesarre, with a capacity of 7,960 seats.

History

Barakaldo played the 1918–19 season in the Category C of the Regional Championship and became the champion without losing a single game throughout the season, promoted to category B.

Barakaldo lost its place in the second category in the 1944–45 season, but in the 1945–46 season the club returned to the Segunda División. Nevertheless, the next 1946–47 season was not successful for the club. It finished in the 11th position among 14 teams, just one point away from the last position. In the following campaign Barakaldo improved its position, finishing 9th.

Club names
Baracaldo Football-Club – (1917–1942)
Baracaldo Oriamendi – (1940–43)
Baracaldo Altos Hornos – (1943–71)

Season to season

30 seasons in Segunda División
36 seasons in Segunda División B
24 seasons in Tercera División
1 season in Tercera División RFEF

Current squad

Honours
Segunda División B (3): 1979–80, 1997–98, 2001–02
Tercera División:
Winners (7): 1929–30 1930–31 1957–58, 1962–63, 1963–64, 1971–72, 1976–77
Winners: 1987–88

Notes

Famous players

Note: this list includes players that have played in at least 100 league games and/or have reached international status.
 Serafín Aedo
 Pablito Barcos
 Bata
 Germán Beltrán
 Luis María Echeberría
 Javier Escalza
 Raúl García
 Guillermo Gorostiza
 Iosu Iglesias
 Venancio
 Manuel Sarabia
 Telmo Zarra

Famous coaches

 José María Amorrortu
 Carmelo Cedrun
 Iñigo Liceranzu
 Mané
 Eusebio Ríos

Stadium

References

External links
Official website 
Futbolme team profile 
Barakaldo Femenino at Txapeldunak

 
Barakaldo
Football clubs in the Basque Country (autonomous community)
Association football clubs established in 1917
1917 establishments in Spain
Sport in Biscay
Segunda División clubs